Power & Politics is a Canadian television news program focused on national politics, which airs live daily on CBC News Network from 5 p.m. to 7 p.m. Eastern Time weekdays and as a syndicated  podcast. The program normally originates from the CBC's Ottawa studios.

The program launched on October 26, 2009 as a replacement for the long-running CBC News: Politics, which had ended its run the preceding May with the retirement of host Don Newman. The new program was initially hosted by CBC journalist Evan Solomon. In September 2011, Rosemary Barton was added as host of the program's Friday edition after Solomon was also named host of CBC Radio One's The House. Barton also served as substitute host on other days if Solomon was unavailable, and other CBC political journalists occasionally filled in as well.

After Solomon's dismissal from the CBC on June 9, 2015, Barton served as the interim host of the show, with Terry Milewski as a back-up. On January 5, 2016, the CBC officially named Barton as the permanent host of the show. Following Barton's departure from the show in September 2017 upon being named one of the new anchors of The National, the show was hosted by various interim hosts including David Cochrane, Catherine Cullen and Terry Milewski. In March 2018, Vassy Kapelos was named the new permanent host of the show.

Kapelos left the program in November 2022 to join CTV News as host of Power Play and Question Period. After being hosted on a rotating basis by David Cochrane and Catherine Cullen, Cochrane was named as the permanent host on February 16, 2023.

See also 

 Political podcast

References 

2009 Canadian television series debuts
2000s Canadian television talk shows
CBC News Network original programming
Political podcasts
Television shows filmed in Ottawa
2010s Canadian television talk shows
2020s Canadian television talk shows
Canadian political television series
2000s Canadian television news shows
2010s Canadian television news shows
2020s Canadian television news shows